Marion Robertson may refer to:
 Pat Robertson (born 1930, Marion Gordon "Pat" Robertson), American media mogul and former minister
Marion Thomson (1911-2007, née Robertson), New Zealand lawyer